Lieutenant Wilbert Wallace White was a World War I flying ace credited with eight aerial victories. He was recommended for the Medal of Honor for his heroic self-sacrifice.

Early life
The son of a Protestant minister had graduated from Mercersburg Academy in 1907 and the University of Wooster in 1912, and was married with two children when he volunteered for military service.

Aerial service
White enlisted in the U.S. Army Air Service in July 1917. He trained in Canada. He reported to the 147th Aero Squadron in February 1918. He scored a double victory to begin, shooting down two Fokker D.VIIs on 24 July 1918. On 14 September, he shot down a German observation balloon and another Fokker D.VII. On 27 September, he got two more victories, sharing one with two other pilots. On 10 October, he shot down a Hannover CL in conjunction with Kenneth Porter and another pilot shortly past noon.

Three hours later, he took off again. He had already become the 147th Aero Squadron's leading ace and had orders to return to the United States when he flew this last sortie. When he saw Jasta 10 German ace Wilhelm Kohlbach's Fokker D.VII on the tail of an inexperienced pilot, White intervened. White's guns jammed and he was unable to fire at Kohlbach, so he rammed the German instead, to score his eighth and Kohlbach's fifth victory. While White fell to his death, Kohlbach took to his parachute in one of the first fighter pilot bailouts in history. White was posthumously recommended for the Medal of Honor, but was instead awarded an Oak Leaf Cluster to his DSC.

See also

 List of World War I flying aces from the United States

References

Bibliography
 American Aces of World War I. Norman Franks, Harry Dempsey. Osprey Publishing, 2001. , .

1889 births
1918 deaths
Recipients of the Distinguished Service Cross (United States)
American World War I flying aces
American military personnel killed in World War I